Events from the year 1890 in the United States.

Incumbents

Federal government 
 President: Benjamin Harrison (R-Indiana)
 Vice President: Levi P. Morton (R-New York)
 Chief Justice: Melville Fuller (Illinois)
 Speaker of the House of Representatives: Thomas Brackett Reed (R-Maine)
 Congress: 51st

Events

January–June
 January–June period – George W. Johnson becomes the first African American to record phonograph cylinders, in New York.
 January 1 – In Michigan, the wooden steamer Mackinaw burns in a fire on the Black River.
 January 2 – Alice Sanger becomes the first female staffer in the White House.
 January 22 – The United Mine Workers is founded.
 January 25 – Journalist Nellie Bly completes her round-the-world journey in 72 days.
 February 24 – Chicago is selected to host the Columbian Exposition.
 March 2–7 – The Cherry Creek Campaign occurs in Arizona Territory.
 March 3 – The first American football game in Ohio State University history is played in Delaware, Ohio against Ohio Wesleyan University; Ohio State wins 20–14.
 March 8 – North Dakota State University is founded in Fargo, North Dakota.
 March 27 – A tornado strikes Louisville, Kentucky, killing 76 people and injuring 200.
 March 28 – Washington State University is founded in Pullman, Washington.
 May – National American Woman Suffrage Association established.
 May 2 – Oklahoma Territory is organized.
 May 31 – The 5-story skylight Cleveland Arcade opens in Cleveland, Ohio.
 June 1 – The United States Census Bureau begins using Herman Hollerith's tabulating machine to record census returns using punched card input, a landmark in the history of computing hardware. Hollerith's company eventually becomes IBM.
 June 12 – On Lake Huron (Michigan), the wooden steamer Ryan is lost near Thunder Bay Island.
 June 20 – The Picture of Dorian Gray by Oscar Wilde published by Philadelphia-based Lippincott's Monthly Magazine.

July–December

 July 2 – The Sherman Antitrust Act becomes United States law.
 July 3 – Idaho is admitted as the 43rd U.S. State (see History of Idaho).
 July 10 – Wyoming is admitted as the 44th U.S. State (see History of Wyoming).
 July 13 – In Minnesota, storms result in the Sea Wing disaster on Lake Pepin killing 98.
 August 6 – At Auburn Prison in New York, William Kemmler becomes the first person to be executed in the electric chair.
 August 10 – In Boston, Irish-born poet John Boyle O'Reilly dies suddenly, aged 46. The death triggers a mass outpouring of grief and tributes across the country and the world.
 September – The Church of Jesus Christ of Latter-day Saints President Wilford Woodruff issues the "1890 Manifesto" officially advising against any future polygamy in the Church.
 September 25 – Sequoia National Park created.
 October 1 – Yosemite National Park created.
 October 11 – In Washington, D.C., the Daughters of the American Revolution is founded.
 October 13 
The Delta Chi fraternity is founded by 11 law students at Cornell University in Ithaca, New York.
On Lake Huron, the schooner J. F. Warner is lost in Thunder Bay (Michigan).
 November 29 – In West Point, New York, the United States Navy defeats the United States Army 24-0 in the first Army-Navy football game.
 December 24 – The Oklahoma territorial legislature establishes three institutions of higher learning University of Oklahoma, Oklahoma State University, and University of Central Oklahoma.
 December 29 – Wounded Knee Massacre: Near Wounded Knee Creek, South Dakota the U.S. 7th Cavalry Regiment tries to disarm a Native American camp and shooting starts. 153 Lakota Sioux and 25 troops are killed; about 150 flee the scene.

Undated
 The United States city of Boise, Idaho drills the first geothermal well.
 The corrugated cardboard box is invented by Robert Gair, a Brooklyn printer who developed production of paper-board boxes in 1879.
 The Demarest Building, a commercial building on Fifth Avenue in New York City, is completed as the first with an electric elevator (installed by Otis).
 The march "High School Cadets" is written by John Philip Sousa.
 Brown trout are introduced into the upper Firehole River in Yellowstone National Park.

Ongoing
 Gilded Age (1869–c. 1896)
 Gay Nineties (1890–1899)
 Progressive Era (1890s–1920s)

Sport 
September 30 – The Brooklyn Bridegrooms clinch the National League pennant.

Births
 January 4 – Victor Adamson, Western film director, producer, screenwriter and actor (died 1972)
 January 22 – Fred M. Vinson, 13th Chief Justice of the Supreme Court (died 1953)
 January 28 – Robert Franklin Stroud, "Birdman of Alcatraz" (died 1963)
 February 18 
 Edward Arnold, actor (died 1956)
 Adolphe Menjou, film actor (died 1963)
 February 24 – Marjorie Main, character actress (died 1975)
 February 27
 Freddie Keppard, jazz cornet player (died 1933)
 Art Smith, pilot (died in aviation accident 1926)
 March 11 – Vannevar Bush, science administrator (died 1974)
 March 21 – C. Douglass Buck, U.S. Senator from Delaware from 1943 to 1949 (died 1965)
 March 28 – Paul Whiteman, bandleader (died 1967)
 April 7
 Marjory Stoneman Douglas, conservationist and writer (died 1998)
 Harry W. Hill, admiral (died 1971)
 April 13 – Frank Murphy, politician and Associate Justice of the Supreme Court of the United States (died 1949)
 April 23 – Adelbert Ford, psychologist (died 1976)
 May 1 – Laurence Wild, basketball player and 30th Governor of American Samoa (died 1971)
 May 11 – Woodall Rodgers, lawyer and politician, Mayor of Dallas (died 1961)
 May 15 – Katherine Anne Porter, author (died 1980)
 June 1 – Frank Morgan, character actor (died 1949)
 June 26
 Oscar C. Badger II, admiral (died 1958)
 Jeanne Eagels, actress (died 1929)
 July 22 – Rose Kennedy, philanthropist and matriarch of the Kennedy family (died 1995)
 July 26 – Daniel J. Callaghan, admiral (killed in action 1942)
 August 20 – H. P. Lovecraft, horror fiction author (died 1937)
 September 9 - Colonel Sanders, founder of Kentucky Fried Chicken (died 1980) 
 September 20 – Jelly Roll Morton, jazz pianist, composer and bandleader (died 1941)
 September 24 – Allen J. Ellender, U.S. Senator from Louisiana from 1937 to 1972 (died 1972)
 October 1
 Katherine Corri Harris, socialite and actress, first wife of John Barrymore (died 1927)
 Alice Joyce, silent film actress (died 1955)
 Blanche Oelrichs, poet, second wife of John Barrymore (died 1950)
 October 2 – Groucho Marx, comedian (died 1977)
 October 8 – Eddie Rickenbacker, race car driver and World War I fighter pilot (died 1973)
 October 13 – Conrad Richter, fiction writer (died 1968)
 October 14 – Dwight D. Eisenhower, 34th President of the United States from 1953 to 1961 (died 1969)
 October 20 – Sherman Minton, U.S. Senator from Indiana from 1935 to 1941, Associate Justice of the Supreme Court of the United States from 1949 to 1956 (died 1965)
 October 25 – Floyd Bennett, aviator and explorer (died 1928)
 December 21 – Hermann Joseph Muller, geneticist, recipient of the Nobel Prize in Physiology or Medicine in 1946 (died 1967)
 December 25 – Robert Ripley, collector of odd facts (died 1949)
 December 26 – Uncle Charlie Osborne, Appalachian fiddler (died 1992)

Deaths
 January 2 – George Henry Boker, poet and playwright (born 1823)
 January 28 – Prudence Crandall, educationist (born 1803)
 February 22 – John Jacob Astor III, businessman (born 1822)
 March 2 – James E. English, U.S. Senator from Connecticut from 1875 to 1876 (born 1812)
 March 19 – John S. Hager, U.S. Senator from California from 1873 to 1875 (born 1818)
 April 1 – David Wilber, politician (born 1820)
 April 19 – James Pollock, politician (born 1810)
 April 30 – Marcus Thrane,  author, journalist, and the leader of the first labour movement in Norway (born 1817)
 May 3 – James B. Beck, U.S. Senator from Kentucky from 1877 to 1890 (born 1822 in Scotland)
 May 15 – Edward Doane, Protestant missionary in Micronesia (born 1820)
 June 11
 George Edward Brett, publisher (born 1829)
 Hugh Buchanan, politician from Georgia (born 1823)
 June 30 – Samuel Parkman Tuckerman, composer (born 1819)
 July 9 – Clinton B. Fisk, philanthropist and temperance activist (born 1828)
 July 10 – Thomas C. McCreery, U.S. Senator from Kentucky from 1868 to 1871 (born 1816)
 July 13 – John C. Frémont, soldier, explorer and U.S. Senator from California from 1850 to 1851 (born 1813)
 August 6 – William Kemmler, murderer, first person executed in the electric chair (born 1860)
 August 10 – John Boyle O'Reilly, poet, novelist, journalist and transportee (born 1844 in Ireland) 
 September 8 – Isaac P. Christiancy, Chief Justice of the Michigan Supreme Court and U.S. Senator from Michigan from 1875 to 1879 (born 1812)
 September 30 – Frederick H. Billings, lawyer and financier (born 1823)
 October 7 – John Hill Hewitt, songwriter (born 1801)
 October 8 – James W. Deaderick, Chief Justice of the Tennessee Supreme Court from 1876 to 1886 (born 1812)
 October 20 – Alfred B. Mullett, architect (born 1834)
 November 7 – Comanche, horse, survivor of Custer's cavalry at the Battle of the Little Bighorn
 December 15 – Sitting Bull, Native American chief (born c. 1831)
 Ann Leah Underhill, one of the Fox sisters, fraudulent medium (born 1814)

See also
 List of American films of the 1890s
 Timeline of United States history (1860–1899)

References

External links
 

 
1890s in the United States
United States
United States
Years of the 19th century in the United States